Justin Brown (born March 10, 1991) is a wide receiver for the Toronto Argonauts of the Canadian Football League (CFL). Before his 2013 draft selection by the Pittsburgh Steelers, he played college football at Oklahoma for his senior season after transferring from Penn State.  After being drafted, Brown was on the Steelers practice squad for his rookie season. He played eight games during the 2014 season for a total of 12 passes for 94 yards and one lost fumble. Following the 2014 NFL season, Brown was waived by the Steelers. On February 3, 2015, the Buffalo Bills claimed Brown off waivers. On August 9, 2015, Brown was waived/injured by the Bills. On August 13, 2015, he reached an injury settlement with the Bills and was released.

On May 11, 2017, Brown signed with the Toronto Argonauts of the Canadian Football League.

References

1991 births
American football wide receivers
Canadian football wide receivers
American players of Canadian football
Buffalo Bills players
Living people
Oklahoma Sooners football players
Penn State Nittany Lions football players
People from Cheltenham, Pennsylvania
Pittsburgh Steelers players
Players of American football from Pennsylvania
Toronto Argonauts players
Sportspeople from Montgomery County, Pennsylvania